In enzymology, a formate kinase is an enzyme that catalyzes the chemical reaction

ATP + formate  ADP + formyl phosphate

Thus, the two substrates of this enzyme are ATP and formate, whereas its two products are ADP and formyl phosphate.

This enzyme belongs to the family of transferases, specifically those transferring phosphorus-containing groups (phosphotransferases) with a carboxy group as acceptor.  The systematic name of this enzyme class is ATP:formate phosphotransferase. This enzyme participates in glyoxylate and dicarboxylate metabolism.

References

 

EC 2.7.2
Enzymes of unknown structure